Royal coat of arms, Royal Coat of Arms or Royal Arms may refer to:

 Royal arms of Cambodia, the coat of arms of the Cambodian monarch and Cambodia
 Arms of Canada, the coat of arms of the Canadian monarch and Canada
 Royal coat of arms of Denmark, the coat of arms of the Danish monarchy
 Royal arms of England, the coat of arms of the English monarchy and England from the 12th century to 1707
 Royal coat of arms of Great Britain, the coat of arms of the monarchy of Great Britain and Great Britain from 1707 to 1800
 Royal arms of Scotland, the coat of arms of the Scottish monarchy and Scotland from the 12th century to 1707
 Royal coat of arms of the United Kingdom, the coat of arms of the monarchy of the United Kingdom and the United Kingdom